Hugues Bedi Mbenza (born 11 September 1984, in Milange) is a Congolese footballer, who most recently played for TP Mazembe.

Career
The midfielder began his career with AC Dynamique and joined in 2006 to Bel'Or Kinshasa. After one and a half year signed on 1 January 2007 with TP Mazembe, who played in both the 2009 and 2010 FIFA Club World Cup.

On 17 December 2011, Bedi left Mazembe for Belgian powerhouse R.S.C. Anderlecht the player has not convinced the staff and the team could not wait for his late integration.
On 14 January 2013, Bedi Mbenza signs a two years and half contract with a Tunisian club Club Africain.

International career
He has represented the Congo DR national football team.

References

External links

1984 births
Living people
Democratic Republic of the Congo footballers
Democratic Republic of the Congo international footballers
Association football midfielders
TP Mazembe players
Democratic Republic of the Congo expatriate footballers
R.S.C. Anderlecht players
Belgian Pro League players
Expatriate footballers in Belgium
Club Africain players
Expatriate footballers in Tunisia
2011 African Nations Championship players
FC Renaissance du Congo players
21st-century Democratic Republic of the Congo people
2009 African Nations Championship players
Democratic Republic of the Congo A' international footballers
Democratic Republic of the Congo expatriate sportspeople in Belgium